Samira Saleh Ali al-Naimi (1963 – 22 September 2014) was an Iraqi human rights activist and lawyer. During the Islamic State of Iraq and the Levant's occupation of Mosul, she posted comments on her Facebook account critical of ISIS' destruction of religious shrines there. She was abducted by masked men and tried by a "self-styled" Sharia court for apostasy. After being tortured for five days, she was publicly executed on 22 September 2014.

Her killing was condemned by the United States State Department. The Gulf Center for Human Rights condemned the execution, recalling the "prominent lawyer and human rights defender... defending detainees and supporting the disadvantaged families in the city", adding that "this heinous crime and other ISIS crimes are crimes against humanity."

References

1963 births
2014 deaths
Iraqi human rights activists
20th-century Iraqi lawyers
Iraqi women lawyers
Victims of human rights abuses
Iraqi women's rights activists
20th-century Iraqi women politicians
20th-century Iraqi politicians
21st-century Iraqi women politicians
21st-century Iraqi politicians
21st-century Iraqi lawyers
2014 murders in Iraq
Violence against women in Iraq